Robert Funaro (born January 23, 1959) is an American film and television actor. Funaro is best known for the role of Eugene Pontecorvo in the Emmy Award-winning television series The Sopranos.

Funaro appeared in the 2007 film American Gangster as Detective McCann and in 2012 appeared on the tenth episode of the second season of the CBS show Blue Bloods, titled "Whistle Blower" as NYPD Captain Browne.

Background 

Funaro was born in Brooklyn, New York. His Italian ancestors were from Naples.

He lives in New Dorp, Staten Island.

Filmography

Film

Television

Video games

References

External links

1959 births
Living people
American male film actors
American male television actors
American people of Italian descent
Male actors from New York (state)
People from Brooklyn
People from New Dorp, Staten Island
21st-century American male actors